Matt Parish is an Australian professional rugby league football coach who is the head coach of Samoa and a former professional rugby league footballer.

Playing career
Parish played in 55 first-grade matches for the Balmain Tigers between 1988 and 1993. He was tough, durable utility player who was well respected throughout the club before injuries in 1993 restricted him to just five games.

In 1994 and 1995, Parish moved to the country and began his coaching career whilst still playing. He captain-coached Gosford Townies to the semi-finals before doing the same with Macquarie Scorpions in the 1996 Newcastle competition. In 1997, he moved to The Entrance Tigers where he similarly had immediate success. Parish continued to coach there until 2006, before moving to take up an NRL assistant coaching role at the North Queensland Cowboys.

Coaching career
He moved into coaching, and served as assistant coach of the North Queensland Cowboys and the New South Wales State of Origin team.

In June 2011, Parish was appointed head coach of the Salford City Reds in the Super League, on a contract until the end of 2013. After taking charge in July, he coached the side for six matches, winning one, before resigning in November 2011. Parish cited "personal reasons" for leaving the club, though the Manchester Evening News reported that he had fallen out with the club's administration, having been critical of a number of aspects of the club's management. Shortly after leaving Salford, he returned to Australia and was appointed an assistant coach of the Manly-Warringah Sea Eagles, then the reigning National Rugby League premiers.

He coached the Samoans to a quarter-final appearance in the 2013 Rugby League World Cup. Earlier in the tournament Samoa faced New Zealand. The Samoans were down 36-4 in the second half, until the Samoans gave 'the Kiwis' a scare scoring 20 consecutive points, getting to within 13 points of the lead with 15 minutes to go in the match. However, the 'Kiwis' scored one more try to seal the match. The Samoans won their next two games against the Kumuls and the French, to secure their spot in the quarterfinal where they took on Pacific rivals Fiji. They lost, 22-4, ending their World Cup campaign.

In October 2022 he named his Samoa squad for the 2021 Rugby League World Cup.

Samoa record

Personal life
In May 2014, it was revealed that Parish was dating Suzanne Hadley, estranged wife of Australian broadcaster Ray Hadley. The pair separated in April 2016. In February 2017, it was revealed that Suzanne Hadley had applied for an apprehended violence order against Parish. In April 2017, Parish agreed to abide to a six month restraining order which includes not assaulting, threatening, harassing or intimidating Hadley. He also agreed not to contact her unless it is through a lawyer and not go near her home or place of work.

References

 

Living people
Australian rugby league coaches
Australian rugby league players
Balmain Tigers players
Place of birth missing (living people)
Rugby league centres
Rugby league wingers
Salford Red Devils coaches
Samoa national rugby league team coaches
Year of birth missing (living people)